Brooktree Park is a census-designated place and unincorporated community in Cass County, North Dakota, United States. Its population was 80 as of the 2010 census.

Demographics

References

Census-designated places in Cass County, North Dakota
Census-designated places in North Dakota